Altust is Turkish band Athena's first studio album, released on November 11, 2014. It was their next studio album after 2010 Pis. All the songs in the album belong to Gökhan Özoğuz and Hakan Özoğuz. The album was recorded live at FadeOut Studios by producer Mike Nielsen.

Track listing 
 Davet
 Kafama Göre
 Üç Lira Bir Anahtar
 Kaçak
 Yamyam Zurna
 Ses Etme
 Yapma Be Kanka
 Kalem
 Parçalanıyoruz
 Bu Adam Fezadan
 Tek Başına
 Adımız Miskindir Bizim (feat. Mazhar Alanson)
 Bela

References 

2014 albums